Oxbridge is a portmanteau of Oxford and Cambridge Universities.

Oxbridge may also refer to:

Places 
 Oxbridge, Dorset
 Oxbridge, Stockton-on-Tees

Schools 

 Oxbridge Academy (South Africa)
 Oxbridge Academy, a private school located in West Palm Beach, Florida, United States

Other uses 

 Oxbridge Blues, a television series
The route between Oxford and Cambridge
 "Oxbridge Expressway" was sometimes used to refer to the proposed Oxford–Cambridge Expressway
 "Oxbridge Line" is used to refer to the historic Varsity Line (18451967) or to East West Rail, its modern replacement (under construction). 
 Oxbridge reject, a pejorative term

See also 

 List of fictional Oxbridge colleges
 Oxbridge Arc: see Oxford–Cambridge Arc
 
 Uxbridge (disambiguation)